The 1930 New Hampshire Wildcats football team was an American football team that represented the University of New Hampshire as a member of the New England Conference during the 1930 college football season. In its 15th season under head coach William "Butch" Cowell, the team compiled a 5–2–1 record, and outscored their opponents, 160–54. The team played its home games in Durham, New Hampshire, at Memorial Field.

Schedule

In 15 contests between New Hampshire and Brown, played during 1905–1931, the 1930 game was the only Wildcat victory.

Wildcat co-captain Herbert Hagstrom would go on to serve as principal and later superintendent of nearby Portsmouth High School; he died in March 1971 at age 62. Co-captain Kenneth Clapp died in September 1959 at age 51; he had served in World War II and worked for Kraft Foods in the Chicago area.

Notes

References

New Hampshire
New Hampshire Wildcats football seasons
New Hampshire Wildcats football